In 1988 the National League, also known as British League Division Two, was the second tier of speedway racing in the United Kingdom.

Summary
The league champions that year were Hackney Kestrels.

Final table

National League Knockout Cup
The 1988 National League Knockout Cup was the 21st edition of the Knockout Cup for tier two teams. Hackney Kestrels were the winners of the competition.

First round

Quarter-finals

Semi-finals

Final
First leg

Second leg

Hackney were declared Knockout Cup Champions, winning on aggregate 110–82.

Leading averages

Riders & final averages
Arena Essex

Martin Goodwin 9.68
David Smart 7.27
Rob Tilbury 6.75
Nigel Leaver 5.80 
Chris Cobby 5.71 
Ian Humphreys 4.76
Simon Wolstenholme 4.61

Berwick

Mark Courtney 10.07
Charlie McKinna 8.40
Steve McDermott 6.66
Rob Grant Sr 6.55
Sean Courtney 6.12
Phil Kynman 5.30
Rob Woffinden 4.75
Wayne Ross 4.61
Ian Stead 4.56
Scott Robson 2.15

Eastbourne

Gordon Kennett 9.97
Andy Buck 9.56
Dean Standing 7.71
Dean Barker 7.37
Keith Pritchard 5.62
David Norris 5.00
Jon Surman 4.44
Darren Standing 4.32

Edinburgh

Les Collins 9.00
Jamie Luckhurst 8.60
Doug Wyer 7.27
Brett Saunders 6.57
Scott Lamb 4.69
Rob Woffinden 4.59
Jeremy Luckhurst 4.24
Darrell Branford 2.86
Mike Long 2.74

Exeter

Steve Regeling 7.90
Colin Cook 6.80
Richard Green 6.46
Alan Rivett 6.43
Dave Trownson 6.16
Peter Jeffery 5.53
Andy Sell 5.32
Rob Fortune 4.72
Tony Mattingley 2.90
Bruce Cribb 3.24

Glasgow

Kenny McKinna 10.05
Steve Lawson 8.69 
David Blackburn 7.33
Phil Jeffrey 5.36
Shane Bowes 5.01
Martin McKinna 4.17
Geoff Powell 3.73
Wayne Ross 3.06
Michael Irving 2.20

Hackney

Mark Loram 10.34
Andy Galvin 9.86
Chris Louis 8.04
Alan Mogridge 7.41
Paul Whittaker 7.29
Gary Rolls 5.94
Barry Thomas 5.92

Long Eaton

Keith White 8.40
Glenn Doyle 7.83
Mike Spink 6.20
Gary O'Hare 5.44
Richie Owen 4.00
Darrell Branford 3.48
Dave Morton 3.29
Wayne Elliott 3.21
Jon Roberts 2.92
Steve Bishop 2.71

Middlesbrough

Mark Fiora 9.45 
Darren Sumner 8.10
Martin Dixon 8.00
Peter McNamara 5.80
Ashley Norton 4.56
Nigel Sparshott 4.52
Geoff Pusey 3.80
Andy Sumner 3.74
Andy Buck 3.04
David Clay 2.86
Max Schofield 2.38
Paul Bentley 2.33

Mildenhall

Melvyn Taylor 10.11
Dave Jackson 7.74
Andy Hines 7.08
Eric Monaghan 6.62
Glen Baxter 5.66
Michael Coles 5.59
Paul Blackbird 2.57
Simon Green 2.56

Milton Keynes

Troy Butler 8.72 
Alastair Stevens 7.67
Carl Baldwin 7.51
Trevor Banks 7.20 
Ian Clark 6.44
Mark Carlson 6.10
Tony Primmer 6.07
Nigel Sparshott 5.61
Paul Atkins 3.65

Peterborough

Mick Poole 9.52
Ian Barney 8.41
Kevin Hawkins 7.98
Craig Hodgson 7.81 
Jamie Habbin 5.72
John Stokes 4.97
Pete Chapman 4.55

Poole

Steve Schofield 10.22
David Biles 8.48 
Craig Boyce 7.65
Kevin Smart 6.68
Tony Langdon 6.67
Gary Allan 5.58
Robbie Fuller 4.98
Nigel Flatman 4.90
Steve Bishop 4.48
Steve Langdon 3.50

Rye House

Jens Rasmussen 9.28
Paul Woods 8.12
Steve Wilcock 6.27
Mark Lyndon 5.59
Kevin Brice 4.53
Carl Chalcraft 4.50
Peter Schroeck 3.46
John Wainwright 2.67
Kevin Teager 2.38

Stoke

Nigel Crabtree 9.16
Graham Jones 8.92
Louis Carr 8.02
Steve Bastable 6.96
Derek Richardson 6.87
Paul Fry 5.18
Wayne Broadhurst 2.48
Jon Hughes 2.08

Wimbledon

Kevin Jolly 9.05
Ray Morton 8.30
Todd Wiltshire 7.66
Roger Johns 7.29
Alastair Stevens 7.20
Andy Campbell 6.59
Nathan Simpson 6.26
Terry Mussett 4.73
Rodney Payne 4.00

See also
List of United Kingdom Speedway League Champions
Knockout Cup (speedway)

References

Speedway British League Division Two / National League